It Must Be Love may refer to:
"It Must Be Love" (Labi Siffre song), a 1971 song by Labi Siffre, later covered by Madness
"It Must Be Love" (Don Williams song), a 1979 song by Don Williams, later covered by Alan Jackson
"It Must Be Love" (Alton McClain and Destiny song), a 1979 song by Alton McClain and Destiny
"It Must Be Love" (Ty Herndon song), a 1998 song by Ty Herndon
It Must Be Love (1926 film), a 1926 American silent film, directed by Alfred E. Green
It Must Be Love (2004 film), a 2004 television film starring Ted Danson

See also
This Must Be Love (disambiguation)